Shironam is an Indian Bengali language drama film directed by Indranil Ghosh and features Jishu Sengupta, Swastika Mukherjee and Saswata Chatterjee under the banner of R P Techvision.

The film was released in theatres on 21 October 2020, coinciding with Puja holidays.

Cast 
 Jishu Sengupta
 Saswata Chatterjee
 Swastika Mukherjee
 Anjan Dutt
 Santilal Mukherjee

Release 
The film was made back in 2017. after Travelling some Festivals it rereleased in Pujo 2020 with Positive Reviews.

References

External links 
 

2020 films
Bengali-language Indian films
2020s Bengali-language films
Films about journalism
Films about media manipulation
2020 drama films